Enrico Tazzoli was one of three s built for the  (Royal Italian Navy) during the 1930s. Completed in 1936, she played a minor role in the Spanish Civil War of 1936–1939 supporting the Spanish Nationalists. She operated in the Atlantic during the Second World War and was second only to the submarine Leonardo da Vinci as the highest scoring Italian submarine of the conflict. Enrico Tazzoli was converted in 1943 to be a submarine transport for blockade-running between Europe and the Far East. She was lost on her first voyage in this role.

Design and description
The Calvi class was an improved and enlarged version of the preceding  submarine cruisers. They displaced  surfaced and  submerged. Their crew numbered 77 officers and enlisted men.

For surface running, the boats were powered by two  diesel engines, each driving one propeller shaft. When submerged each propeller was driven by a  electric motor. They could reach  on the surface and  underwater.

The boats were armed with eight  torpedo tubes, four each in the bow and in the stern for which they carried a total of 16 torpedoes. They were also armed with a pair of  deck guns, one each fore and aft of the conning tower, for combat on the surface. Their anti-aircraft armament consisted of two twin-gun mounts for  machine guns.

Construction and career
Enrico Tazzoli, named after Enrico Tazzoli, was laid down by Odero-Terni-Orlando at their Muggiano, La Spezia shipyard in 1932, launched on 14 October 1935 and completed the following year. During the Spanish Civil War, she unsuccessfully attacked a Republican destroyer off Cartagena with four torpedoes on 27 December. During her patrol off Cartagena on 13–27 January 1937, the submarine missed a ship with two torpedoes.

Italy's entry into World War II in June 1940 found Tazzoli in operations in the western Mediterranean. In October she was assigned to BETASOM, the Regia Marina's task force in the Atlantic campaign. In December Tazzoli operated off the British Isles in company with five other Italian boats, but saw little success.

Operations during the autumn and winter of 1940 showed the Italian vessels were ill-suited to conditions in the North Atlantic, so the spring 1941 saw a change in strategy by Admiral Donitz, the German U-boat Commander (BdU). The BETASOM boats were assigned to long-distance patrols into the mid and south Atlantic, in a bid to spread the commerce war further afield. During this period Tazzoli was commanded by Carlo Fecia di Cossato, one of Italy's foremost naval officers. Tazzolis next patrols, to the Azores in the spring and to West Africa in the summer were more successful, claiming three victims in each case.

In December 1941 Tazzoli was involved in the rescue of the crews from the German commerce raider Atlantis and the supply ship Python, both sunk by British cruisers in the South Atlantic. With her sister ships Calvi and Finzi she brought home over 200 survivors, a journey of several thousand miles and regarded as an epic of maritime rescue.

In February 1942 Tazzoli made her most successful raiding patrol, to the Caribbean as part of Operation Neuland. Over a two-month period she sank six Allied merchant ships. In summer she returned to the Caribbean, but in nearly three months found only two victims. At the end of the year Tazzoli operated off the coast of Brazil, claiming four more victims.

In March 1943 Tazzoli was handed over for conversion to a submarine transport, for blockade-running to the Far East, and her commander received a new posting.

Fate
On 17 May contact was lost, and she was pronounced missing. One source suggests Enrico Tazzoli was sunk in the Bay of Biscay in attacks by USS Mackenzie, while another suggests she was sunk by aircraft in the Bay of Biscay on 23 May. There is no confirmed explanation for her loss.

Patrol history
Tazzoli conducted ten war patrols over a 30-month period, and made one voyage as a blockade-runner.

Successes
Tazzoli is credited with sinking 18 ships, for a total of 96,650 GRT, making her the highest-scoring Italian submarine after Leonardo da Vinci.

See also
Italian submarines of World War II

Notes

References

External links
 Enrico Tazzoli (1935) Marina Militare website

Calvi-class submarines
World War II submarines of Italy
Lost submarines of Italy
World War II shipwrecks in the Atlantic Ocean
Maritime incidents in May 1943
Ships lost with all hands
Ships built in Italy
1935 ships